Harishchandra is an Indian king mentioned in ancient Hindu religious texts.

Harishchandra may also refer to:

Films

Based on the life of Harishchandra 
 Raja Harishchandra, a 1913 Marathi silent film directed by Dadasaheb Phalke
 Satyavadi Raja Harishchandra, a 1917 Marathi silent short film directed by Dadasaheb Phalke
 Satyawadi Raja Harishchandra, a 1917 Bengali silent film directed by Rustomji Dhotiwala
 Harishchandra (1932 film), a 1932 Tamil film directed by Raja Chandrasekhar and Sarvottam Badami
 Satya Harishchandra (1943 film), a Kannada film directed by R. Nagendra Rao
 Harischandra (1944 film), a Tamil film directed by K. Nagabhushanam
 Satya Harishchandra (1951 film), a 1951 Nepali-language film
 Harishchandra (1955 film), a Malayalam film directed by Anthony Mithradas
 Satya Harishchandra (1965 Kannada film), a Kannada film directed by Hunsur Krishnamurthy
 Satya Harishchandra (1965 Telugu film), a Telugu film directed by K. V. Reddy
 Harichandra (1968 film), a Tamil film directed by K. S. Prakash Rao

Other films 
 Harichandra (1998 film), a 1998 Tamil film directed by Cheyyar Ravi
 Harischandraa, a remake of the above, a 1999 Telugu-language romance film directed by Thulasi Kumar
 Harishchandrachi Factory, a 2009 Marathi film depicting the struggle of Dadasaheb Phalke in making Raja Harishchandra
 Satya Harishchandra (2017 film), a 2017 Kannada film directed by Dayal Padmanabhan

People

Politicians
 Harischandra Devram Chavan (born 1951, member of the 15th Lok Sabha of India
 Harishchandra Patil, Indian politician and member of the Bharatiya Janata Party
 Tejlal Tambhare Harishchandra, Indian politician from the state of the Madhya Pradesh

Other people
 Bharatendu Harishchandra (1850-1885), Indian novelist, poet, playwright, and father of modern Hindi literature
 Harishchandra (Gahadavala dynasty), Indian king who reigned from 1194 to 1197 CE
 Harishchandra Abeygunawardena, vice-chancellor of University of Peradeniya from 2006 to 2009
 Harishchandra Birajdar (1950–2011), wrestler and wrestling coach from India

Other 
 Harischandra Mills, a Sri Lankan food processing company named after its founder, C. A. Harischandra

See also
 Harish Chandra (disambiguation)